David Garner (born 1958 in Ebbw Vale, South Wales) is a Welsh installation artist known for his use of found objects and overtly political themes.

Biography

Garner was born in Ebbw Vale, South Wales. He studied art in Newport and Cardiff, and from 1981 studied at the Royal College of Art (RCA), London. Here he received a scholarship to work in the RCA studio in Paris. Subsequently he returned to South Wales, with a desire to root his artistic practice here, now it had been transformed by the loss of the mining industry. According to curator David Briers, Garner "has an international perspective both on world affairs and on the art world. But at the same time he savours the relative isolation of his situation as a professional artist, distancing himself from the frenzied manoeuvring of metropolitan artists for short-term celebrity status."

Welsh artist Ivor Davies has described Garner as "one of the few, one of the most important artists in Britain". Garner received the "Ivor Davies Award" (from the National Eisteddfod) and his work "Politics Eclipsed by Economics" has been bought by the "Richard and Rosemary Wakelin Purchase Award".

Garner's 2013 exhibition, Shift, at Newport Art Gallery, was launched by a public demonstration against the proposed closure of the city's temporary exhibition programme. Garner created a special artwork, A Case of the Great Money Trick, which was inspired by the campaign against the gallery closure. A limited edition artist publication was also created to coincide with the exhibition which included the essay "Shifting and Shaking" by critic and writer Hugh Adams. Adams describes Garner as "a considerable narrator: his objects’ stories are tragedies – of events, situations, feelings, strivings and usually, failings... he shows society’s deliberate inhumanity, its clear, deliberate and cynical viciousness."

In 2015 the National Museum & Galleries of Wales purchased Last Punch of the Clock, for its contemporary collection. 
Garner became a successful recipient of the ACW Creative Wales Award, allowing him to broaden the medium in which he works, through exploring the possibilities of time-based media and their potential outcomes for his future work.  As a result of this award Garner staged Call and Response, an installation comprising a chandelier at the Chartist Cave, Trefil, Mynydd Llangynidr, and an improvised response from harp player Rhodri Davies, on 20 August 2015.

Garner was included in Tomorrow Today at ‘Created by Vienna’  2015, a city festival of contemporary art which reflected on the interface between art and capital. The eponymous essay "Tomorrow Today" by the philosopher and literary scholar Armen Avanessian focuses on artistic strategies for a post-capitalist era.
Alfredo Cramerotti, Director at Mostyn curated On Being in the Middle, an exhibition at ‘Created by Vienna’ hosted by Galerie Hubert Winter and produced by Vienna City Agency.

Garner was shortlisted for Cymru yn Fenis Wales in Venice 2019 La Biennale di Venezia 58th International Art.

Notable exhibitions
 On Being in the Middle as part of Tomorrow Today, Galerie Hubert Winter, 11 September to 7 November 2015
 Shift, Newport Art Gallery, April to June 2013
 Future Tense, Aberystwyth Arts Centre, 26 September to 10 November 2012
 Y Lle Celf, National Eisteddfod of Wales, Bala, July 2009
 Whatever They Say I Am, That's What I'm Not, Cynon Valley Museum and Gallery, Aberdare, January to March 2008
 End Product, Aberystwyth Arts Centre, City Gallery Leicester, Oriel Davies, Newtown
 Memento, G39 Cardiff, 25 September to 19 October 2002

References

External links
 

Living people
1958 births
Welsh artists
Members of The Welsh Group
People from Ebbw Vale
Political artists
21st-century Welsh artists